Tonyosynthemis ofarrelli, more commonly known as the slender tigertail, is a species of Odonata from the family Synthemistidae. It is found in Queensland, Australia, along the eastern coast. They tend to live along or near freshwater streams or rivers, which is also where Odonata tend to lay their eggs.

Life
As an adult, Tonyosynthemis ofarrelli is a predator, feeding on smaller dragonflies and larvae. Females lay their eggs along streams. Samples of larvae and exuviae were collected at multiple sites in the 1990s in north-eastern New South Wales, Australia. The sites consisted of the Timbara River near Billyrimba, the Boonoo Boonoo Falls, and at Wild Bull Park along the Wilson River, also nicknamed "The Bluff". Researchers successfully collected first-instar exuviae and a specimen of a female along the Wilson River, which matches the description from an earlier specimen of a confirmed male Tonyosynthemis ofarrelli, so scientists have concluded that the female specimen collected is that of Tonyosynthemis ofarrelli.

Female specimen
The female's head was dark brown in colour, with a small yellow spot below its eyes. Its wings were lacking the male's yellow median ray, but did include a membrane based at the bottom of the wings that was dirty yellow in colour. The specimen's abdomen was slightly compressed, and a section of its tergum was without a yellow dorsal spot, although the rest of its tergum did include various dorsal patches.

Gallery

References

Synthemistidae
Odonata of Australia
Endemic fauna of Australia
Taxa named by Günther Theischinger
Taxa named by J.A.L. (Tony) Watson
Insects described in 1986